Lydford railway station was a junction at Lydford between the Great Western Railway (GWR) and London and South Western Railway (LSWR) situated in a remote part of north-west Dartmoor in Devon, England.

History
The station, known then as "Lidford", was opened on 1 June 1865 with the Launceston and South Devon Railway, a  broad gauge line that connected with the South Devon and Tavistock Railway to offer a service to Plymouth Millbay railway station.  This line eventually became a part of the GWR.

On  12 October 1874 the LSWR line was opened from Okehampton railway station.  This was a  standard gauge line that carried trains direct from London Waterloo station, whereas passengers to the GWR's London Paddington station had to travel on the branch line to Plymouth and then change onto a main line train.

On 17 May 1876 a junction was opened between the two lines and LSWR trains could then reach its new station at Devonport by running over the GWR's route, which was mixed gauge. On 1 June 1890 a new line, built by the Plymouth, Devonport and South Western Junction Railway, gave the LSWR a route to Devonport independent of the GWR.  The GWR line was converted to standard gauge on 20 May 1892.

The connection between the two lines was removed in 1895 but was replaced in 1943 to give flexibility should the railway lines around Plymouth be damaged by World War II  bombing.  Other connections were installed at Launceston railway station and at St Budeaux.

The station had been renamed "Lydford" on 3 June 1897.  Trains were withdrawn from the former GWR branch on 31 December 1962 but continued on the main line until 6 May 1968.  Goods traffic ceased on 7 September 1964.

Description
The original station had a passing loop and two platforms, with the station offices on the platform used by trains towards Plymouth.  The LSWR built their platforms alongside the original ones, so the original booking office became a waiting room on an island platform with both companies opening new offices on their respective outside platforms.

From 1 March 1914 the LSWR took responsibility for the GWR platforms.  The GWR signal box was closed on 8 January 1917, when signal controls were combined in a single box on the central platform with two lever frames – one for each line – placed back to back.  The signalman had trains from Tavistock on his left when working the GWR frame, but on his right when working the LSWR one.

Goods traffic was handled in a yard at the north end of the station between the two lines with access from both.

References

Further reading

Disused railway stations in Devon
Former London and South Western Railway stations
Railway stations in Great Britain opened in 1865
Railway stations in Great Britain closed in 1968
Beeching closures in England